Ji'an Township, is a rural township in Hualien County, Taiwan. It has 18 villages and a population of 83,750 inhabitants. 

Ji'an is the second most populous place in Hualien County after Hualien city). The township has mountainsides, a seashore and a wide alluvial plain. The main inhabitants include Hoklo, Hakka, and Aboriginal peoples. The economy is flourishing in areas of agriculture, commerce and industry, and is deeply connected with the adjacent city Hualien city.

History
Ji'an was first settled by the aboriginal Amis people and was called Cikasuan, meaning a flourishing timber land in the Amis language. Han Chinese settlers arrived in the 1850s and called the area . During Japanese rule, the Amis guarded the area for the Japanese authorities, against the Truku people. The Amis were underpaid for their services, and organized , after which the Japanese removed them from the area. Subsequently, the Governor-General of Taiwan encouraged Japanese to immigrate the regions of Hualien and Taitung and established a village here called  in 1910. In 1937, it was reformed and administered by Karenkō Prefecture. In 1948 after the Kuomintang takeover, to reduce the Japanese flavor of the name, it was renamed as the current Ji'an Township.

Geography
The township is located at the Huadong Valley. It has subtropical monsoon and humid climate with summer average temperature of 27.3°C (81°F) and winter average temperature of 17.3°C (63°F).

Administrative divisions
Yongan, Taichang, Qingfeng, Jian, Fuxing, Nanhua, Gancheng, Yongxing, Daoxiang, Nanchang, Yichang, Beichang, Shengan, Renli, Tungchang, Renan, Renhe and Guanghua Village.

Tourist attractions

 A-mei Civilization Village
 Big River Praise
 Cingsio Temple
 Spoondrift
 Tulip Garden
 Nan Pu Green Forest Park
 Maple Forest Trail
 Chi Jiue Chuan Bicycle Trail

Transportation

Rail
 TRA Ji'an Station (Hwa-tung Line)

Road
 Provincial Highway No.9
 Provincial Highway No.11
 Provincial Highway No.11C
 County Road No. 193

References

External links

Office of Ji'an Township

Townships in Hualien County